Michael McLeod (born February 3, 1998) is a Canadian professional ice hockey centre for the  New Jersey Devils in the National Hockey League (NHL). McLeod was selected by the Devils with the 12th pick in the 2016 NHL Entry Draft.

Playing career

Junior
McLeod played minor hockey with the Toronto Marlboros of the Greater Toronto Hockey League. In 2014, he led his team to capture the OHL Cup and was awarded the Tim Adams Memorial Trophy as the OHL Cup's most valuable player.

McLeod was drafted by the Mississauga Steelheads in the 1st round (5th overall) of the 2014 OHL Priority Selection, and has played with the Steelheads since the 2014–15 OHL season.

Professional 
On October 7, 2016, the Devils signed McLeod to a three-year entry-level contract. In a preseason game on September 25, 2017, McLeod tore his meniscus in his left knee and required arthroscopic surgery. When he was activated from injured reserve he was reassigned to the Mississauga Steelheads.

On April 3, 2018, McLeod was assigned to the Binghamton Devils of the American Hockey League following the conclusion of his OHL career. McLeod was recalled for the first time by the Devils on November 29, following Jean-Sébastien Dea being picked up on waivers by the Pittsburgh Penguins. He made his NHL debut the following night in a 6–3 loss to the Washington Capitals, and was sent back to the Binghamton Devils the following day.

Personal life
He is the older brother of Ryan McLeod, who is a member of the Edmonton Oilers organization after being drafted by them in the 2018 Entry Draft 40th overall. His other brother, Matt McLeod, played for Canisius College. He is close friends with former Steelheads and current Devils teammate Nathan Bastian.

McLeod was a member of Team Canada in the 2018 World Junior Ice Hockey Championships.

Career statistics

Regular season and playoffs

International

Awards and honours

References

External links

1998 births
Living people
Binghamton Devils players
Canadian ice hockey centres
Mississauga Steelheads players
National Hockey League first-round draft picks
New Jersey Devils draft picks
New Jersey Devils players
Ice hockey people from Ontario
Sportspeople from Mississauga